Nuthinaw Mountain is a mountain on the Stikine Plateau in northern British Columbia, Canada, located east of Tutsingale Mountain and  northwest of Dease Lake on the north side of Tachilta Lakes. It is a product of subglacial volcanism during the Pleistocene period when this area was covered by thick glacial ice, forming a subglacial volcano that never broke through the overlying glacial ice known as a subglacial mound.

Nuthinaw is a Tahltan name meaning Cariboo fence went right into mountain.

See also
 List of Northern Cordilleran volcanoes
 List of volcanoes in Canada
 Volcanism of Canada
 Volcanism of Western Canada

References

External links
 Nuthinaw Mountain in the Canadian Mountain Encyclopedia
 Catalogue of Canadian volcanoes: Nuthinaw Mountain

One-thousanders of British Columbia
Volcanoes of British Columbia
Subglacial mounds of Canada
Stikine Plateau
Pleistocene volcanoes
Monogenetic volcanoes
Northern Cordilleran Volcanic Province